Pankow or Pankov is a surname of Slavic origin, used mostly in Russia. In Slavic countries it is reserved for males, while the feminine counterpart is Pankowa or Pankova. It is also a habitational name from a Slavic place name derived from the Slavic element pank, penk "swamp" and -ow "place".  Notable people with the surname include:

 Alexander Pankov (born 1991), Russian ice hockey player
 Bill Pankow (born 1952), American film editor
 Ekaterina Pankova, Russian volleyball player
 Gisela Pankow (1914–1998), French psychoanalyst
 James Pankow (born 1947), American trombone player and songwriter, founding member of the band Chicago
 John Pankow (born 1954), American actor, brother of James Pankow
 Konstantin Pankov (1910–1942), Soviet painter
 Larisa Pankova (born 1991), Russian road bicycle racer
 Marina Pankova (born 1963), Russian volleyball player
 Natalia Pankova (born 1965), Russian artist
 Nikolay Pankov (born 1965), Russian politician
 Pavel Pankov (born 1995), Russian volleyball player
 Radovan Pankov (born 1995), Serbian football player 
 Rudy Pankow (born 1998), American actor 
 Sergei Pankov (disambiguation), several people
 Steven Pankow (1908–1993), Mayor of Buffalo, New York
 Vadim Pankov, Russian volleyball trainer
 Vladimir Pankov, Soviet sprint canoer 
 Yevgeni Pankov (born 1983), Russian football player

See also
Pankau

References

Slavic-language surnames

ru:Панков